The George Benson Cookbook is the third studio album by jazz/soul guitarist George Benson, and the second to be produced by John Hammond.

Background
The Hard Bop Homepage says of the album, "This is basically the George Benson quartet, with Smith and Cuber, but trombonist Bennie Green and percussionist Pucho were added on some tracks, giving them a bop flavor that delighted dedicated jazz fans and critics. Benson's quartet was modeled after Jack McDuff's--with baritone saxophonist Ronnie Cuber, organist Lonnie Smith, a powerhouse player who deserved more attention than he ever received, and Jimmy Lovelace or Marion Booker on drums. The sonorous tone of Cuber's baritone gives the quartet a richer, more dense texture than that obtained by McDuff, who used a tenor, but the overall sound is the same. At twenty-five, Ronnie Cuber was an alumnus of Marshall Brown's celebrated Newport Youth Band; he had spent the previous two years with Maynard Ferguson's very loud and brassy orchestra, which may account for his aggressive style, but Cuber's approach also emphasized rhythm, and that was precisely the ingredient called for by a "soul jazz" group of this kind."

Track listing
All tracks composed by George Benson; except where indicated

2007 remastered CD / Blu-spec CD bonus tracks

Personnel
The George Benson Quartet
George Benson – guitar; vocals on "All of Me"
Ronnie Cuber – baritone saxophone
Bennie Green – trombone
Lonnie Smith – organ
Albert Winston – bass
Paul H. Brown - bass (uncredited on album)
Jimmy Lovelace – drums
Marion Booker, Jr. – drums

References

George Benson albums
1967 albums
Columbia Records albums
Albums produced by John Hammond (producer)